Juan Manuel Mateo (born December 17, 1982) is a former professional baseball pitcher. A right-handed starting pitcher, he played part of the 2006 season in Major League Baseball with the Chicago Cubs. He last played for the Vaqueros Laguna in the Mexican League.

Career
During the 2006 season, he was with the Double-A West Tenn Diamond Jaxx until his call-up to the Cubs on August 1. On August 3, Mateo made his major league debut in a start in a game against the Arizona Diamondbacks as he replaced Greg Maddux in the rotation as he had just been traded. Mateo went 5 innings and picked up his first career win.

On May 2, 2008, he refused an assignment to Single-A Daytona and became a free agent. He later signed with the Pittsburgh Pirates, and became a free agent again at the end of the season. On December 22, 2008, he re-signed with the Pirates.

On February 1, 2010, Mateo signed a minor league contract with the Los Angeles Angels of Anaheim, but never pitched in their organization. In 2011, he signed with Vaqueros Laguna.

References

External links

1982 births
Altoona Curve players
Arizona League Cubs players
Chicago Cubs players
Daytona Cubs players
Dominican Republic expatriate baseball players in Mexico
Dominican Republic expatriate baseball players in the United States
Indianapolis Indians players
Iowa Cubs players
Lansing Lugnuts players

Living people
Major League Baseball pitchers
Major League Baseball players from the Dominican Republic
Mexican League baseball pitchers
Peoria Chiefs players
Vaqueros Laguna players
West Tennessee Diamond Jaxx players